Portland Bowers Roach is a type of limestone from the Isle of Portland in Dorset, southern England, on the Jurassic Coast, a World Heritage Site.

Bowers Roach was used to construct parts of Broadcasting House, situated in Portland Place, London.

See also
 Bowers Basebed
 Portland stone

References

Further reading

Limestone
Isle of Portland